The Le Fantasque class of six large, very fast destroyers was ordered under the French naval programme of 1930. They served in World War II for both Vichy France and the Free French Forces.

Design and description
The Le Fantasque-class ships were designed to counter the fast Italian  light cruisers, and one member of the class, exceeded  during trials to set a world record for a conventionally-hulled ship. The crew of the Le Fantasque class consisted of 11 officers and 221 crewmen in peacetime and the number of the latter increasing to 254 in wartime.

The ships were fitted with two  turbo generators in the engine rooms. In addition, a pair of  diesel generators were located in the aft engine room.

Armament and fire control
The main armament of the Le Fantasques consisted of five 50-caliber Canon de  Modèle 1929 guns in single shielded mounts, one superfiring pair fore and aft of the superstructure and the fifth gun abaft the aft funnel. The Le Fantasques could stow 200 rounds for each gun, plus 75 star shells.

Their anti-aircraft (AA) armament consisted of two 50-caliber semi-automatic  Modèle 1925 AA guns in single mounts positioned amidships. Firing  projectiles at a rate of fire of 20 rounds per minute. In addition there were two twin-gun mounts for Hotchkiss Mitrailleuse de  CA Modèle 1929 AA machine guns aft of the 37 mm mounts.

The ships carried three above-water triple sets of  torpedo tubes; the aft mount could traverse to both sides, but the forward mounts were positioned one on each broadside. A pair of depth charge chutes were built into their stern; these housed a total of sixteen  depth charges with another dozen available in the torpedo magazine. The ships could be fitted with rails to drop forty  Breguet B4 mines.

Fire control for the main guns was provided by a Mle 1929 electro-mechanical fire-control computer that used data provided by a  OPL/SOM SJ.1 stereoscopic rangefinder atop the bridge. The Le Fantasque class ships were the first s to be fitted with a prototype remote-control gunnery system that was intended to automatically lay the guns on the target while compensating for the ship's motions. The electric motors were insufficiently sensitive and often overcompensated, while the circuit breakers for the elevation motors often tripped when trying to use the system while the ships were rolling heavily, taking the system off-line. A pair of  OPL Mle J.1930 high-angle stereoscopic rangefinders were mounted on the superstructure amidships to control the anti-aircraft guns.

Modifications
In late 1936 the Mle 1929 computers were upgraded and the high-angle rangefinders amidships were replaced by  OPL J4.1935 models during 1937. In December 1938 and April 1939, the Hotchkiss machine guns were transferred to newly built platforms on each side of the bridge and the OPL Mle J.1930 rangefinders formerly positioned amidships were installed on the bridge to control them. Development of the originally intended twin-gun mounts for the automatic 70-caliber Canon de 37 mm Modèle 1935 AA guns was completed three years late and they replaced the single-gun mounts between January and May 1940. Beginning in September the ships still in French hands were equipped with one or two Browning 13.2-millimeter anti-aircraft machine guns mounted on the quarterdeck. In 1941–1942 the quarterdeck guns were transferred to positions forward of the bridge and the Hotchkiss machine guns were repositioned on new platforms on the center superstructure. The ships had the aft superstructure remodeled at the same time to create a platform atop the aft ammunition hoists and platforms on each side for 37 mm guns. The twin-gun mounts was repositioned on the upper platform and one of the lower platforms while the other one was occupied by a single mount as there was a shortage of twin-gun mounts.

After the war began in September 1939, the depth-charge stowage aboard the Le Fantasques increased to 48. In addition the mine rails were replaced by a pair of rails for  depth charges. Each rail could accommodate 3 depth charges and 15 more were stored in the magazine. In 1942 the four undamaged ships still under Vichy French control were given Alpha-2 sonar systems in cases. Based on the British Type 128 Asdic system, they could not be installed until the hull was modified to accommodate the required flexible underwater dome which was scheduled for the following year.

In Free French service
 had been seized by the British in July 1940 and was turned over to the Free French. Later that year her aft superfiring 138.6 mm gun replaced by a British 4-inch (102 mm) Mk V AA gun and a Type 128 Asdic system was installed. The 35 kg depth charges and their rails were removed and the ship was fitted with four Modèle 1918 depth-charge throwers abreast the aft superstructure for  depth charges. During a subsequent refit in mid-1941, the Hotchkiss machine guns were relocated to positions on the forecastle deck and their former positions were occupied by single mounts for 2-pounder Mk II AA guns. A quadruple mount for Hotchkiss machine guns taken from the battleship  was installed atop the aft superstructure and rails for British Mk VIIH depth charges were installed on the stern. A fixed antenna for a Type 286M search radar was also installed. A late 1942 refit in Australia exchanged the 13.2 mm machine guns for six  Oerlikon light AA guns and the Type 286M radar was replaced by a Type 290 system with a rotating antenna.

The Americans installed SA early-warning, SF surface-search and a British Type 285 fire-control radar, removed her aft torpedo tubes to save weight and converted some boiler feedwater tanks to fuel oil to improve her range. Her AA armament had been removed earlier and now consisted of six  Bofors guns in twin-gun mount and eleven Oerlikon guns in single mounts.

After repairing damage suffered during the Naval Battle of Casablanca in November 1942  followed her sisters to the United States and was similarly refitted. In 1944–1945, the supplies of the French 200 kg depth charges began to run out so the depth charge chutes were sealed off and rails for Mk VIIIH depth charges were added to those ships that lacked them. In December 1944, Le Malin had her worn-out Mle 1929 guns replaced by salvaged Mle 1927 guns.

Ships

Notes

References

 
 

 
World War II destroyers of France
Destroyer classes
Ship classes of the French Navy